Tevian Dray (born March 17, 1956) is an American mathematician
who has worked in general relativity, mathematical physics, 
geometry, and both science and mathematics education.  He was elected a Fellow of the American Physical Society in 2010.

He has primarily worked in the area of classical general relativity.  His
research results include confirmation of the existence of solutions of
Einstein's equation containing gravitational radiation, the use of
computer algebra to classify exact solutions of Einstein's equation, an
analysis of a class of gravitational shock waves (including one of the few
known exact 2-body solutions in general relativity), and
the study of signature change, a possible model for the
Big Bang.  More recently, his work has focused on applications of the
octonions to the theory of fundamental particles.

He was a graduate student under Rainer K. Sachs at
Berkeley, where he received his Ph.D.
in 1981, although much of his dissertation research was done in collaboration with
Abhay Ashtekar. The context of his dissertation, titled The Asymptotic Structure of a Family of Einstein-Maxwell Solutions focused on families of spacetimes which describe accelerating black holes, and which contain gravitational radiation. This demonstrated the existence of exact radiating solutions to the Einstein field equations.
He is currently a professor of mathematics at 
Oregon State University.  In addition to his ongoing work in mathematical physics,
he has made significant contributions in science education, where he directs
the Vector Calculus Bridge Project,
 an attempt to teach vector
calculus the way it is used by scientists and engineers, and is part of the
development team of the Paradigms Project,
 a complete
restructuring of the undergraduate physics major around several core
"paradigms".  He has written a book 
on special relativity and a sequel on general relativity using differential forms.
, and is coauthor of The Geometry of the Octonions released in 2015.

Bibliography
 
 
 
 
 (2012) Tevian Dray, The Geometry of Special Relativity (A K Peters/CRC Press) 
 (2014) Tevian Dray, Differential Forms and The Geometry of General Relativity (A K Peters/CRC Press) 
 (2015) Tevian Dray and Corinne A. Manogue, The Geometry of the Octonions (World Scientific)

References

External links
 Tevian Dray's home page
 Vector Calculus Bridge Project
 Paradigms Project

1956 births
Living people
20th-century American mathematicians
21st-century American mathematicians
American relativity theorists
Oregon State University faculty
Fellows of the American Physical Society